The Koensayr BTL Y-wing assault starfighter/bomber are a series of fictional spacecraft from the Star Wars franchise. They are depicted as the star fighters of the Galactic Republic, Rebel Alliance, New Republic, and the Resistance; being ideally suited for anti-shipping, close air support,  air interdiction, force protection and ground attack missions.  Y-wing made their theatrical appearance in Star Wars Episode IV: A New Hope and have featured in movies, television shows, and the Star Wars expanded universe's books, comics, and games.

Origin and design
Colin Cantwell, who also designed the saga's TIE fighters, initially designed the Y-wing with a large bubble turret for a gunner. However, the dome did not appear properly when filmed against bluescreen and subsequent designs omitted the turret.

Appearances
In the original Star Wars movie (1977), a group of Y-wings designated "Gold Squadron" took part in the attack on the Death Star.  Led by squadron leader Jon Vander (Angus MacInnes), Y-wings made the first unsuccessful "trench run" on the Death Star's exhaust port, and only one Y-wing would survive the battle itself. (The pilot of the surviving Y-Wing differs between Canon and Legends)  Y-wings made a brief appearance at the end of The Empire Strikes Back (1980) when the heroes are reunited with the Rebel fleet, and feature alongside other Rebel starfighters during the climatic space battle of Return of the Jedi (1983).

Y-wings were later seen in The Clone Wars 2008 television series.  Here they are depicted as fighter-bombers used by the Galactic Republic in the Clone Wars against the Separatists. General Anakin Skywalker is shown leading a squadron of Y-wings on one of their first missions to take out a Separatist cruiser, where they are noted for their powerful shields and secondary gunner.  In the Star Wars Rebels 2014 animated series, the crew of the Ghost are shown stealing Old Republic Y-wings, in the process of being dismantled by the Galactic Empire, for use by the nascent Rebel Alliance.

Y-wings made their theatrical reappearance in Rogue One (2016), an anthology film set immediately prior to the events of the original Star Wars film.  Here the Y-wings of Gold Squadron are shown playing a pivotal role during the Battle of Scarif in disabling an Imperial Star Destroyer with ion torpedoes.  Y-wings would appear again during the climax of Star Wars: The Rise of Skywalker (2019).

Depiction
Based on Star Wars supplemental retail material, the Galactic Republic commissioned Koensayr Manufacturing to produce the BTL-B Y-wing during the early part of the Clone Wars.  Prized for its durability and long-range striking capability, the success of the Y-wing prompted further production of the original model and a number of variants.  However, when the war concluded and the Galactic Empire came to power, Y-wings were decommissioned and relegated to military surplus sellers or scrapyards.  The Rebel Alliance sought to buy or commandeer as many Y-wings as possible and they became the most readily available starfighters to the Rebellion during the Galactic Civil War.  Rebel Y-wings were used to perform a variety of missions including courier, escort and reconnaissance.

The original BTL-B Y-wing features a forward module seating a pilot in the cockpit and a gunner in a bubble turret.  An astromech droid (which served as the fighter's navigation system) fits into a dedicated socket behind them.  The module contains the starfighter's armaments: two forward-firing laser cannons, twin ion cannons in the turret, and a pair of torpedo launchers with six-round magazines capable of launching bombs, cluster missiles and other ordnance.  The module connects to two powerful ion engines via reinforced central spar and cross wing, all encased in heavy armor plating.  Variants include the BTL-S3, which replaces the bubble turret with a remote-controlled turret and seats the gunner behind the pilot in the cockpit, and the BTL-A4, which removes the gunner altogether and gives the pilot control of the ion cannons.

Once acquired, Rebel technicians modified the fighter-bombers to make them more suitable to the Rebellion's hit-and-run tactics.  Armor plating was removed to save on weight and make it easier to perform maintenance, compensated for by increasing deflector shield power.  Various other components were removed or rearranged - such as replacing the six-round torpedo magazines with four-round versions - to lighten weight and increase performance while maintaining overall integrity.  The resulting modification makes these Rebel Y-wings faster and more lethal than the original version.

After the defeat of the Empire, Koensayr introduced a new version of the Y-wing to capitalize on the fighter's popularity.  This BTA-NR2 model emulates the look of the Rebel-modified Y-wings both because the public is more familiar with this version and because it allows for greater customization.  While outwardly mimicking the "classic" Y-wing design, the new version features various upgrades including stronger shields and more sophisticated sensors.

Cultural impact

In 2018, Star Wars starfighters had their aerodynamic abilities tested using the Autodesk Flow Design virtual wind tunnel program.  Of those tested, the Y-wing had a drag coefficient of .68, which, while worse than the real-life example of the F-4E Phantom with a rating of .02, was better than that of most TIE Fighters tested.  These poor results were rationalized with the in-universe explanations that drag coefficient plays no role in space travel and that Star Wars fighters can use repulsorlifts and deflector shields to give themselves better flight profiles.

References

External links
 
 

Star Wars spacecraft
Fictional elements introduced in 1977

sv:Lista över farkoster i Star Wars#Y-wing